Terance, Terence, or Terrence Mann may refer to:
 Terrence Mann (born 1951), American actor, singer, and director
 Terance Mann (born 1996), American professional basketball player
 Terence Mann, fictional character in the movie Field of Dreams